Royston Duggan Quinn (18 June 1919 – 25 May 2001) was an Australian rules footballer who played in the Victorian Football League (VFL) from 1943 to 1944 for the Richmond Football Club and then from 1945 until 1946 for the North Melbourne Football Club.

Quinn's father Billy Quinn played 11 VFL games for Melbourne Football Club in 1914.

References

External links
 
 

1919 births
2001 deaths
Richmond Football Club players
Richmond Football Club Premiership players
North Melbourne Football Club players
Ormond Amateur Football Club players
Australian rules footballers from Melbourne
One-time VFL/AFL Premiership players
People from South Yarra, Victoria